The 3rd Annual European Film Awards were given out in 1990.

Winners and nominees
Bold indicates winner in the category.

European Film
   Porte aperte (Open Doors) 
  Cyrano de Bergerac
  Matj (Mother)
  Przesluchanie (Interrogation)
  Skyddsängeln (The Guardian Angel)
  Tulitikkutehtaan tyttö (The Match Factory Girl)
  ¡Ay, Carmela!

Young European Film
   Henry V 
  La blanca paloma (The White Dove)
  Turnè (On Tour)
  Un monde sans pitié (Love Without Pity)
  Zamri, umri, voskresni! (Lie Still, Die, Revive)

European Actor
 Kenneth Branagh for Henry V 
 Gérard Depardieu for Cyrano de Bergerac
 Philip Zandén for Skyddsängeln (The Guardian Angel)

European Actress
 Carmen Maura for ¡Ay, Carmela! 
 Anne Brochet for Cyrano de Bergerac
 Krystyna Janda for Przesluchanie (Interrogation)

European Supporting Actor
 Dmitrij Pevsov for Matj (Mother) 
 Gabino Diego for ¡Ay, Carmela!
 Björn Kjellman for Skyddsängeln (The Guardian Angel)

European Supporting Actress
 Malin Ek for Skyddsängeln (The Guardian Angel) 
 Lena Nylen for Skyddsängeln (The Guardian Angel)
 Gunilla Röör for Skyddsängeln (The Guardian Angel)

European Screenwriter
 Vitali Kanevsky for Zamri, umri, voskresni! (Lie Still, Die, Revive)
 Ryszard Bugajski and Janusz Dymek for Przesluchanie (Interrogation)
 Etienne Glaser, Madeleine Gustafsson and Suzanne Osten for Skyddsängeln (The Guardian Angel)

European Cinematographer
 Tonino Nardi for Porte aperte (Open Doors)  Pierre Lhomme for Cyrano de Bergerac
 Göran Nilsson for Skyddsängeln (The Guardian Angel)

European Film Composer
No award was given in this category.
 Jean-Luc Godard for Nouvelle Vague (New Wave)
 Jürgen Knieper for December Bride
 Jean-Claude Petit for Cyrano de Bergerac

European Production Designer
 Ezio Frigerio and Franca Squarciapino for Cyrano de Bergerac  Yuri Pashigoryev for Zamri, umri, voskresni! (Lie Still, Die, Revive)
 Ben van Os, Jan Roelfs and Jean-Paul Gaultier for The Cook, the Thief, His Wife & Her Lover

Special awards
 Special Jury Award I — Gian Maria Volonté
 Special Jury Award II — December Bride
 European Discovery of the Year — Ennio Fantastichini
 European Documentary Film of the Year — Šķērsiela (The Crossroad)
 Special Mention — Step Across the Border
 European Cinema Society Lifetime Achievement Award — Andrzej Wajda
 European Cinema Society Special Award''' — Association of Filmmakers of the USSR

References

European Film Awards ceremonies
1990 film awards
Culture in Glasgow
1990 in Scotland
1990 in British cinema